Canal 8 formerly know as Televisión Nacional de Honduras (Spanish for: National Television of Honduras) or TNH is a state-owned television network based in Tegucigalpa, Honduras. The channel is the first state-owned television channel and is operated by the Ministry of Culture and Telecommunications. Canal 8 went on the air on August 20, 2008.

External links

Canal 8 Honduras at LyngSat Address

References

Television in Honduras
Spanish-language television stations
Television channels and stations established in 1962
Mass media in Tegucigalpa